Morbegno (or) is a little town in the low Valtellina Valley in Italy, on the left side of the Adda river. It is part of the province of Sondrio of Lombardy.

In 2007, it started a project to become a leader in sustainability, by involving the population in a participatory design process, presently labelled "Morbegno 2020". Morbegno is partnering with the international non-profit organization The Natural Step to design a vision of what the people living in Morbegno want to create in the long term, and choose the strategic path to move towards the vision from the present reality.

Morbegno has also been selected as a pilot city in the Di.Mo.Stra. project, by the Association of Italian Municipalities for the diffusion of Strategic Planning models. Finally, on November 21, 1966, it received the honorary title of town with a presidential decree.

Twin cities 
  Llanberis, Wales

External links 
 

Cities and towns in Lombardy